Margaret Wilson (born 25 June 1946) is an Australian former cricketer.
Wilson played one Test match for the Australia women's national cricket team.

References

1946 births
Living people
Australia women Test cricketers
Cricketers from Sydney